Tylototriton shanjing, the emperor newt, Mandarin newt or Mandarin salamander, is a highly toxic newt native to China.

Description 
It has a ridged orange head from which a single orange ridge runs along its back. This ridge is lined with two parallel rows of orange bumps on a black background. The tail and legs are entirely orange. The shade of the orange can be variable.

Defense 
Tylototriton shanjing might seem like easy prey because of its bright coloration, however, it is generally nocturnal, and the top of its vertebrae and skull have especially thick bone. Additionally, the orange warts on its back are poison glands, and when the newt is grabbed, the tips of the ribs will squeeze out poison from the glands. Emperor newts have enough toxin to kill approximately 7,500 mice. Although poisonous, these newts are generally safe for human handling provided that they are handled carefully and gently.

Range and habitat 

They inhabit pools and slow-moving streams in subtropical forests.

Diet  
The emperor newt usually eats small invertebrates in its environment, such as crickets and worms. Emperor newts in captivity are typically given wax worms, crickets, and earth worms.

Taxonomy 
For a long time, emperor newts were classified together with the Himalayan newt (T. verrucosus).

References

External links 

 http://reptilopolis.kanak.fr/urodeles-f24/tylotriton-shanjingnussbaum-brodie-et-yang-1995-t196.htm

shanjing
Endemic fauna of China
Amphibians described in 1995